Mir Amanullah Notezai is a Pakistani politician who was a Member of the Provincial Assembly of Balochistan, from 2002 to May 2018.

Early life and education
He was born on 30 September 1970 in Chagai District.

He has a degree in Bachelor of Arts.

Political career
He was elected to the Provincial Assembly of Balochistan as an independent candidate from Constituency PB-39 Chaghi in 2002 Pakistani general election. He received 5,975 votes and defeated a candidate of Pakistan Muslim League (Q) (PML-Q).

He was re-elected to the Provincial Assembly of Balochistan as a candidate of PML-Q from Constituency PB-39 Chaghi in 2008 Pakistani general election. He received 11,683 votes and defeated a candidate of Pakistan Peoples Party (PPP).

He was re-elected to the Provincial Assembly of Balochistan as a candidate of PML-Q from Constituency PB-39 Chaghi in 2013 Pakistani general election. He received 13,376 votes and defeated a candidate of PPP.

References

Living people
Balochistan MPAs 2013–2018
1970 births
Pakistan Muslim League (Q) politicians
Balochistan MPAs 2002–2007
Balochistan MPAs 2008–2013